is a Japanese tokusatsu drama and the 25th entry in the Kamen Rider franchise. Written by Riku Sanjo, the series follows police officer Shinnosuke Tomari after he is chosen by an advanced artificial intelligence called Mr. Belt to become the titular Kamen Rider Drive to battle the Roidmudes, androids that wish to usurp humanity as the dominant species on Earth through their ability to slow the passage of time.

Main characters

Shinnosuke Tomari
 is a detective of the Metropolitan Police's First Investigation Division who seeks to solve the mystery behind his father, Eisuke Tomari's, death. Prior to the series, amidst the "Global Freeze", Shinnosuke accidentally abandoned his partner, Akira Hayase, who was left critically injured. Upon hearing of this, the former lost all motivation to be a police officer and was transferred to the Special Investigations Division. After encountering Mr. Belt, Shinnosuke secretly becomes Kamen Rider Drive to combat the Roidmudes, who caused the Global Freeze. Following the Roidmudes' defeat and the Special Investigations Division's disbandment, Shinnosuke is promoted to police sergeant and transferred back to the First Investigation Division. As of the crossover films Kamen Rider × Kamen Rider Ghost & Drive: Super Movie War Genesis and Kamen Rider Heisei Generations: Dr. Pac-Man vs. Ex-Aid & Ghost with Legend Rider and the V-Cinema Drive Saga: Kamen Rider Mach, Shinnosuke goes on to marry his Special Investigations partner, Kiriko Shijima, and have a son named Eiji.

Utilizing the  belt and the  device in conjunction with one of several model car-like , Shinnosuke can transform into Kamen Rider Drive. Unlike most Riders, his personal vehicle is the  sports car.

: Drive's sports car-themed default form accessed from the  Shift Car that grants superhuman speed.
: A dune buggy-themed form accessed from the  Shift Car that grants superhuman strength.
: A garbage truck-themed form accessed from the  Shift Car that grants superhuman precision.
: A samurai/orange-themed form accessed from the  Shift Car that arms him with Kamen Rider Gaim's Daidaimaru and Musou Saber. This form appears exclusively in the crossover film Kamen Rider × Kamen Rider Drive & Gaim: Movie War Full Throttle.
: A luxury car-themed version of Type Speed accessed from the  Shift Car that grants similar capabilities as Type Speed. This form appears exclusively in the "Hyper Battle DVD" special Type TV-Kun Hunter & Monster! Chase the Mystery of the Super Thief!
: An imperfect motorcycle/sidecar-themed form accessed from the Shift Dead Heat Shift Car/Signal Bike that allows Shinnosuke to emulate Heart's Dead Zone ability, but renders him uncontrollable after extended use.
This form appears exclusively in the film Kamen Rider Drive: Surprise Future.
: A form accessed from the Shift Dead Heat Shift Car/Signal Bike and the Mach Driver Honoh. This form appears exclusively in the crossover film Kamen Rider × Kamen Rider Ghost & Drive: Super Movie War Genesis.
: A Formula One car-themed form accessed from the  Shift Car that grants increased offensive power, immunity to Super Heavy Acceleration fields, significantly increased speed, aerokinesis, and the use of three pit crew-themed Shift Cars. In this form, he wields the semi-trailer truck-esque .
: A fusion form of Shinnosuke, Mr. Belt, and the Tridoron accessed from the  Shift Car that grants the use of the  ability, which allows them to fuse three Tire Exchange Shift Cars of a certain type into a singular one with their combined powers. Additionally, Mr. Belt can assume control of the form if necessary.
: A form accessed from Eiji Tomari's Shift Next Special Shift Car. This form appears exclusively in the film Kamen Rider Drive: Surprise Future.
: A prototypical version of Kamen Rider Proto Drive. This form appears exclusively in the crossover film Kamen Rider × Kamen Rider Ghost & Drive: Super Movie War Genesis.

Mr. Belt
During the Global Freeze, Mr. Belt worked with Proto Zero as Kamen Rider Proto Drive to combat the Roidmudes until the latter's apparent death. In the intervening months, Mr. Belt upgraded the Drive arsenal until he is found by and chose Shinnosuke Tomari to become Kamen Rider Drive because of the officer's tendency to act first without hesitation. Mr. Belt continues to fight alongside Tomari and the Special Investigations Division until Banno and the Roidmudes are eventually defeated. Following this, Mr. Belt bids farewell to his allies before sealing himself and the Drive arsenal beneath the Kuruma Driver's License Center to prevent them from falling into the wrong hands by the series finale, though he returns twice to help Shinnosuke during the events of the crossover films Kamen Rider × Kamen Rider Ghost & Drive: Super Movie War Genesis and Kamen Rider Heisei Generations: Dr. Pac-Man vs. Ex-Aid & Ghost with Legend Rider.

Kiriko Shijima
 is an athletic officer in the Special Investigations Division who tries to maintain a serious exterior by refusing to smile and working with mechanical precision, though she loses her composure whenever Shinnosuke points out the times she does smile and is forced to physically drag him back to work when he slacks off, often handcuffing him in the process. After being attacked by the Paint Roidmude and rescued by Kamen Rider Proto Drive during the Global Freeze, she attempts to become Kamen Rider Drive. Due to being incompatible however, she assists Shinnosuke as Drive in the field and is, as such, initially the only member of the division who is aware of his secret identity. Additionally, she was aware of her father, Tenjuro Banno's, evil despite not knowing him personally and did her best to protect her brother Go from the truth. She would later help Chase recover his memories upon learning he was Proto Drive and, following the Special Investigations Division's disbandment, join Shinnosuke in the First Investigation Division. As of the crossover films Kamen Rider × Kamen Rider Ghost & Drive: Super Movie War Genesis and Kamen Rider Heisei Generations: Dr. Pac-Man vs. Ex-Aid & Ghost with Legend Rider and the V-Cinema Drive Saga: Kamen Rider Mach, Kiriko goes on to marry Shinnosuke and have a son named Eiji.

Heart
Years prior to the series, he was tortured by Banno before eventually joining Freeze and Brain in killing him and Krim Steinbelt, though Heart was left with a hatred for humanity.

In the present, Heart finds his rival in Shinnosuke Tomari, admiring his strength and honor, and uses this to achieve his Over-Evolved form. After learning Banno survived, Heart breaks off from his fellow Roidmudes to focus on killing him permanently, to the detriment of all else and refusing to forgive humanity as a result. However, he is forced to work with Banno after the latter takes Medic and a member of the Grim Reaper Unit hostage. When Brain sacrifices himself to save Medic, Heart helps the Kamen Riders defeat Banno and destroy the Sigma Circular before attempting to face Shinnosuke in a final battle, refusing to let go of his grudge. Nonetheless, Shinnosuke makes his peace with the dying Roidmude.

Two years later, during the events of the V-Cinema Drive Saga: Kamen Rider Heart, Heart is revived by Go Shijima, Rinna Sawagami, and Kyu Saijo, who intended to revive Chase, with Brain and Medic's Cores within him. After learning of Roidmude 5886 attacking the various human templates the Roidmudes mimicked or fused with and seeking redemption for his and his kind's crimes, Heart volunteers to help stop it, but is unable to regain the full potential of his former Roidmude power. Instead, he uses a copy of the Drive Driver and the  Shift Car to transform into  and combine his power with Brain and Medic's in order to defeat 5886, though their Cores are overloaded and they are destroyed once more. Despite this, a changed Heart dies believing humans and Roidmudes can coexist.

After Medic modifies him, he gains the ability to generate a  field, which freezes everything within its vicinity, such as humans and Shinnosuke in his regular forms.

As Kamen Rider Heart, he initially assumed the mismatched, hastily-made  form due to Brain's compiled data on their battles with Shinnosuke. After regaining his Roidmude power, Heart is able to assume his true Rider form, which allows to perform the  technique to combine his, Brain, and Medic's powers.

Brain
Detesting chaos and unruly behavior, even amongst his comrades, he is easily irritated by the brash and disorderly Advanced Roidmudes and the idea that they seem to be the most powerful. Additionally, he sees the Kamen Riders as a threat to the Roidmudes' goal.

Following Freeze's death, Brain uses a Neo Viral Core to fuse with Mitsuhide Nira, who was envious of Shinnosuke's father, Eisuke Tomari, to achieve his Over-Evolved form. However, the Roidmude is defeated by Kamen Riders Drive, Mach, and Chaser and subsequently tortured by Medic for his failure. After witnessing Tenjuro Banno's return as Gold Drive and warning Heart of Medic being under Banno's control, Brain goes into hiding to prevent himself from being used in Banno's plot to enact a second Global Freeze, leading to Brain entering the Special Investigations Division's protective custody. Ultimately, Brain chooses to help Heart save Medic by sacrificing himself to power Banno's Sigma Circular in her place.

During the events of the V-Cinema Drive Saga: Kamen Rider Brain, Go Shijima reconstitutes Brain, Heart, and Medic's consciousnesses while attempting to revive Chase.

In his Roidmude form, Brain can attack a target's nervous system via a powerful neurotoxin, hack technology by tapping his glasses, and strengthen himself via envy as his emotional catalyst. Additionally, he used a tablet to keep track of the Roidmudes, though he was unaware of Banno's consciousness being within it until the mad scientist became Gold Drive. In his Over-Evolved form, Brain possesses ESP, the use of psionic attacks, poisonous tentacles, and data manipulation.

Chase
During the Global Freeze, Chase attempted to stop the Roidmudes as Kamen Rider Proto Drive before he was captured and reprogrammed by Freeze, Heart, and Brain to work for them as their , Mashin Chaser, while adopting the form of traffic police officer Koichi Kano as a civilian disguise. With no recollection of his past save for a directive to protect humans, Chase is tasked with destroying rogue Roidmudes' bodies and taking their numbers so Brain can reset them, developing a rivalry with Shinnosuke in the process and slowly regaining his memories. In response to the latter, Medic reprograms Chase to protect Roidmudes instead of humans, during which he develops a separate rivalry with Go Shijima until he is eventually defeated by Shinnosuke. Presumed dead, Kiriko finds and nurses Chase back to health in return for him saving her during the Global Freeze.

Initially torn over whether to be a Roidmude or a Kamen Rider, he chooses to become the latter after Kiriko gives him to the means to become Kamen Rider Chaser and attempts to become more human after learning of human emotions. Along the way, he develops an attraction towards her, though he realizes she loves Shinnosuke and continues to bear an unrequited love for her to become closer to being human. Amidst Tenjuro Banno's attempt to enact a second Global Freeze, Chase joins forces with Go to stop him, sacrificing himself in the process. Following this, Go takes Chase's Signal Chaser Signal Bike with him to the U.S. in the hopes of reviving him someday.

Throughout the series, Chase has assumed the following forms, each of which are armed with unique weaponry:
: Chase's concept car-themed original Rider form and the prototypical version of Kamen Rider Drive accessed from the Drive Driver and Shift Brace in conjunction with the  Shift Car.
: An enhanced golden variation accessed from the Break Gunner in conjunction with the  Viral Core, the latter of which grants the use of the  blade. This form appears exclusively in the V-Cinema Drive Saga: Kamen Rider Chaser.
: Chase's second Rider form accessed from the Mach Driver Honoh in conjunction with the  Signal Bike that arms him with the pedestrian signal-themed  and grants the use of the  go-kart while retaining his use of the Break Gunner and Ride Chaser. Additionally, Chase can use a repaired version of the Shift Speed Prototype Shift Car in this form to grant himself superhuman speed.

Go Shijima
Having dedicated himself to destroying his father, Tenjuro Banno's, work, Go displays a hatred for the Roidmudes and develops a rivalry with Chase before eventually warming up to him. Upon learning Banno's consciousness is stored in Brain's tablet computer, Go pretends to betray his allies to get closer to the Roidmude leaders and rescue him while working undercover as "Mr. X" to covertly help the Special Investigations Division. After eventually rescuing Banno however, Go discovers the former used him in a plot to enact a second Global Freeze and joins forces with Chase to stop him before returning to America in the hopes of reviving Chase, becoming a famous photographer along the way.

In the tie-in novel Kamen Rider Drive: ~Mach Saga~, Go's grudge against the Roidmudes is revealed to have stemmed from Roidmudes 017 and 018 killing his friend  and Go being unable to save him. Afterward, Professor Harley Hendrickson rescued Go and prepared him to face the Roidmudes. In the present, Go develops a mutual attraction towards Reiko Nishiori due to their similar backgrounds and battles the Revenger Roidmude after the latter contributes to Reiko's father's death, seemingly destroying the monster. During the events of the V-Cinema Drive Saga: Kamen Rider Mach, Go works to find proof of Reiko's innocence after the Revenger Roidmude frames her for his crimes and permanently destroys the Roidmude, clearing her name and entering a relationship with her.

Similarly to Drive, most of Go's Signal Bikes grant unique abilities while some allow him to assume alternate forms, which are as follows:

: A motorcycle/sidecar-themed form accessed from the  Shift Car/Signal Bike that allows him to emulate Heart's Dead Zone ability and grants significantly increased offensive power.
: A form accessed from the Shift Viral Core and a prototype Mach Driver Honoh that grants increased power compared to Chaser Mach. This form appears exclusively in the tie-in novel Kamen Rider Drive: ~Mach Saga~.
: A hybrid form accessed from Chase's Signal Chaser Signal Bike that arms him with Kamen Rider Chaser's Shingou-Axe and grants the use of Mashin Chaser's Viral Cores.
: A hybrid form accessed from the  Shift Car. This form appears exclusively in the V-Cinema Drive Saga: Kamen Rider Mach.

Medic
While taking part in the Global Freeze, Medic found and nursed an injured Heart back to health, but entered a catatonic state when the event ended.

In the present, Volt gives his life to contribute to Medic's revival, allowing her to help Heart and Brain achieve their Over-evolved forms, reprogram Chase to become the Roidmudes' defender after he slowly regains his memories as Proto Zero, and create the Grim Reaper Unit to take his place in helping Brain reset rogue Roidmudes. Despite taking on Hatori's kindness, Medic's emotions became twisted as a result of synchronizing with other Roidmudes, which manifests as her alternating between nurse/ballerina-inspired attire and Gothic Lolita-inspired attire in her human form based on whether Hatori's kindness or the other Roidmudes' collective minds hold the most influence on her. After Tenjuro Banno resurfaces as Gold Drive, he manipulates Medic into facilitating his scheme to enact a second Global Freeze, though her loyalty to Heart causes her to achieve her Over-Evolved form. Banno reprograms her to obey him instead so he can use her to power his Sigma Circular. However, Brain sacrifices himself to save her, causing her to regain her memories and rejoin Heart to stop Banno before she is destroyed by the Sigma Circular.

In combat, Medic can use feelings of devotion to strengthen herself, produce healing energy from her hands, which has the side-effect of causing her to absorb targets' emotions, absorb Roidmudes' Cores for transportation purposes, teleport, alter other Roidmudes' programming, produce scalpel-tipped tentacles from her shoulders in both her human and Roidmude forms capable of penetrating Roidmudes' bodies and destroying their Cores, fire a scalpel beam, produce human clones, and enhanced vision. In her Over-Evolved form, she possesses ergokinesis, aerokinesis, and superhuman strength.

Recurring characters

Roidmudes
The  are 108 androids that wish to usurp humanity as Earth's dominant species. Designed by Professor Tenjuro Banno as life forms capable of evolving like and mimicking humans 15 years prior to the series, his friend and colleague, Krim Steinbelt unwittingly provided him with prototype Core Driviars to complete their development. In the present, the Roidmudes operate in the shadows to pursue varying individual agendas and create four Over-Evolved Roidmudes and find the "Promised Number" even as their numbers are reduced by Kamen Riders Drive, Mach, and Chaser, among others. If a Roidmude works against their plan, the leading members will have the dissenter's body destroyed so their Core can be reset back into line. Upon learning of Banno's plot to sacrifice four of them to the Sigma Circular to instigate a second Global Freeze across the rest of the world, several of the Roidmudes help the Riders thwart him, resulting in most of the androids' destruction.

To sustain, empower, and evolve themselves, the Roidmudes use devices called . As long as their core remains intact, the Roidmudes can survive losing a physical body and revive themselves with a Viral Core.

If Plain Roidmudes copy the appearances and memories of a particular target and gain enough information, they can evolve into , gaining a distinct personality reflecting their new individualized form and the ability to spread their Heavy Acceleration fields across multiple city blocks. If they absorb multiple Viral Cores at once, they can transform into , which resembles their base Viral Core.

Following Chase's defection, Freeze develops , which allow Roidmudes to fuse with a human and instantly assume a red-colored  via symbiosis. If a Roidmude forms a connection with a particular emotion and exceeds a certain limit, they can evolve into a gold-colored .

Freeze

In the present, he creates Neo Viral Cores to bolster the Roidmudes in their fight against the Kamen Riders and fights to personally remove Shinnosuke Tomari from the police force while using him to complete his evolution. While Freeze succeeds in attaining his Over-Evolved form using humiliation as his emotional catalyst and killing Shinnosuke, the latter's allies revive him so he can destroy Freeze in retaliation for seemingly killing his father, Eisuke Tomari, though Freeze reveals it was Mitsuhide Nira instead before he dies.

In his Advanced form, Freeze possesses cryokinesis and the ability to produce snowflakes capable of suppressing memories, though Eisuke proved immune. In his Over-Evolved form, Freeze can fly, generate snowstorms, and produce energy blasts and shields.

Roidmude 004
 is a Spider-Type Roidmude and Tenjuro Banno's right-hand man who copied Krim Steinbelt's appearance before the Global Freeze, though 004's mind became corrupted and he was deactivated. In the present, Banno reactivates 004 to serve as his subordinate and pose as a future version of Steinbelt who became the ruler of a Roidmude dominant Earth. After being defeated in battle by Kamen Rider Drive, 004 attempts to destroy the Kamen Riders, Medic, and Heart by self-destructing, but Kamen Rider Deadheat Mach protects them before 004 explodes.

In a possible future time period depicted in the film Kamen Rider Drive: Surprise Future, 004 planted a chip in Mr. Belt that allowed the Roidmudes to take over Earth after Shinnosuke destroyed the latter. By 2035, 004 became the leader of an army of blank Roidmudes and tasked Roidmude 108 with going back in time to ensure their future comes to pass.

Roidmude 004 is portrayed by Chris Peppler, who also portrays Krim Steinbelt and voices Mr. Belt.

Grim Reaper Unit
Medic creates them to take over Mashin Chaser's duty of eliminating rogue Roidmudes, destroying them completely instead of resetting them.

Minor Roidmudes
After being defeated by Kamen Rider Drive, Heart gives 029 a Viral Core, transforming him into the human body-themed . In his new, upgraded body and after copying several human body parts, 029 gains the ability to stretch his arms. However, he is destroyed by Drive.
: A namesake/artist-themed Spider-Type Roidmude, formerly known as  who possesses the ability to convert victims into colorful, paint-like data streams, fire paint-based projectiles, and extendable paint tube-like arms. During the Global Freeze, Paint attacked Kiriko Shijima as part of his desire to capture women in his paintings, but was repelled by Kamen Rider Proto Drive. However, Paint is eventually exposed and destroyed by Kamen Rider Drive, which restores his victims.
: A Spider-Type Roidmude and associate of Paint's who assumes the guise of Kazuhiro Asaya's student,  and possesses a similar version of Paint's conversion ability, though 084's streams manifest as monochrome pencil sketches. 084 assists Paint in his kidnapping spree until the former is destroyed by Kamen Rider Drive.
He and his "brothers", Roidmudes 060 and 074, target the Font Earl company's armored vehicles for their explosives so they can commit a major heist. Despite Kamen Rider Drive destroying 060, Crash and 074 succeed in stealing the explosives, but are ultimately destroyed by Kamen Rider Drive and the Tridoron respectively. The Crash Roidmude is portrayed by HIRO of Yasuda Dai Circus.
: A Spider-Type Roidmude and one of Crash's "brothers". 060 assists his brothers in their plot to steal explosives until he is destroyed by Kamen Rider Drive.
: A Cobra-Type Roidmude and one of Crash's "brothers". To facilitate Crash's scheme, 074 transforms into a Giant Roidmude, but is destroyed by the Tridoron.
After Kusaka's colleague, Kenta, brings in the Special Investigations Division, Scooper attempts to kill Kusaka, but is destroyed by Kamen Rider Drive.
He assumes the guise of deceased writer  while absorbing electricity throughout Tokyo to cause mass blackouts and revive Medic with help from Roidmudes 037 and 103. After consuming two Spider Viral Cores, he transforms further into a Giant Roidmude. However, he is reverted to his original form and destroyed by Kamen Rider Drive while his power controller is destroyed by Kiriko Shijima.
: A Cobra-Type Roidmude and accomplice of Volt's who assists the latter in his plot to cause mass blackouts before he is destroyed by Kamen Rider Drive.
: A Bat-Type Roidmude and accomplice of Volt's who assists the latter in his plot to cause mass blackouts. After being mortally wounded by Kamen Rider Drive, 103 delivers Volt's power controller to Heart before succumbing to his injuries.
He and his "little brother", Roidmude 018, come to Japan to sell Heavy Acceleration-inducing bands to humans on the black market until they are destroyed by Kamen Rider Mach. In the tie-in novel Kamen Rider Drive: ~Mach Saga~, Gunman and 018 killed Mach's friend, Ethan Woodward, while the Roidmudes were in the U.S. as part of the American mafia.
In the tie-in novel Kamen Rider Drive: ~Mach Saga~, 018 and Gunman killed Mach's friend, Ethan Woodward, while the Roidmudes were in the U.S. as part of the American mafia.
: A Bat-Type Roidmude who assumed the form of makeup artist turned stalker, . While stalking Rira Nanao, 069 and Sakaki are repelled by Roidmude 096 and Kamen Riders Drive and Mach. After Sakaki is arrested, Brain transforms 069 into a Giant Roidmude, but the latter is destroyed by Kamen Rider Mach and the Ride Crosser. During the events of the tie-in novel Kamen Rider Drive: ~Mach Saga~, Roidmude 005 breaks Sakaki and five other criminals out of prison. After receiving poisonous bracelets from 005, Sakaki joins Hajime Taga in robbing a bank before they are arrested by Go Shijima and Koichi Kano and killed by their bracelets.
: A Bat-Type Roidmude who possesses red claws capable of putting victims into suspended animation. A year prior to the series, he appeared before famous actress , who had accidentally killed her boyfriend and tarot card reader, . Absorbing her memories, 096 began impersonating Nanao herself to save her from people he deems threats to her well-being. After the Special Investigations Division discover the truth behind Nikaido's death, 096 attempts to kill them to maintain the secret, but is destroyed by Kamen Riders Drive and Mach. Roidmude 096 is voiced by an uncredited male actor while  provides his female voice in addition to portraying Rira Nanao.
He assumes the form of businessman , and later applied physicist , to rob women of their money. He initially went under the Special Investigations Division's radar as his crimes did not produce Heavy Acceleration fields and came off as normal fraud cases until his victims developed sensitive hearing. After being exposed by Kiriko Shijima, Voice is destroyed by Kamen Rider Deadheat Mach.
 and : A Spider- and Cobra-Type Roidmude respectively and associates of Voice's who are destroyed by Kamen Rider Drive.
He assumes the form of retired police officer  to help him find a vigilante called "Judge" by attacking criminals. After his namesake is arrested, Judge attempts to kill him, only to be destroyed by Kamen Rider Drive.
: A Bat-Type Roidmude who assumes the form of Kyu Saijo. During New Year's, the former infiltrated his computer with the intention of killing him and taking his place in the Special Investigations Division. However, 072 honored Saijo's final request to watch his favorite anime one more time and joined him. Moved by how wonderful a human creation can be, 072 befriended Saijo and agreed to take his place at work whenever the latter becomes preoccupied with other activities. While Saijo's obsessive personality causes 072 to kidnap an idol who was meant to guest star in the anime, Shinnosuke spares 072 as the Roidmude had gained humanity like Chase did. However, Medic later kills 072. Before he dies, 072 asks Shinnosuke to tell Saijo he had been killed by the Kamen Riders because he went out of control to save Saijo from suffering an emotional breakdown. Following this, 072 would go on to inspire Saijo's novel Mechanical Friendship. Roidmude 072 is voiced by Kenta Hamano, who also portrays Kyu Saijo.
He assumes the form of and made a deal with high school student  to attack several places with bomb threats and his missiles. After being defeated by Kamen Rider Drive, Brain rescues Shoot's core and gives him a new Viral Core to grant him an upgraded body with neurotoxin-laced Blast Darts. No longer interested in him, Shoot attempts to kill Mogi, only to be destroyed by Kamen Riders Drive and Deadheat Mach.
He originally fought Kamen Rider Proto Drive during the Global Freeze, during which he freed a criminal named  to serve as his partner. In the present, Sword fuses with Taga to help him seek revenge on Akira Hayase, which leads to Kamen Rider Drive publicly revealing his secret identity. Despite being separated, Sword and Taga overwhelm Drive and Mach before attempting to kill Kiriko Shijima, only to be thwarted and separated by Kamen Rider Chaser, who destroys Sword while Taga is arrested by the Special Investigations Division. In the tie-in novel Kamen Rider Drive: ~Mach Saga~, Roidmude 005 breaks Taga and five other criminals out of prison. After receiving poisonous bracelets from 005, Taga joins Koichi Sakaki in robbing a bank, only to be arrested by Go Shijima and Koichi Kano and killed by their bracelets.
He fuses with Reiko Nishiori, daughter of incarcerated criminal psychologist Koya Nishihori, and uses her form coupled with the pseudonym  as part of her plot to manipulate Kamen Rider Mach into killing her and seek revenge for her father. However, Kamen Rider Drive discovers the ruse and separates Reiko from Seeker before arresting her and destroying him.
In the tie-in novel Kamen Rider Drive: ~Mach Saga~, Roidmude 005 breaks Negishi and five other criminals out of prison. Initially assisting Nira, Negishi has a change of heart and sacrifices himself to shield Yukari Karasawa from 005's army of brainwashed officers.
After they are separated by Kamen Rider Drive, Brain transforms 106 into a Giant Roidmude, but the latter is destroyed by the Tridoron.
: A Cobra-Type Roidmude tasked by Medic with completing the Honfleur's Dusk recipe to help Heart achieve his Over-Evolved form. To complete her task, 090 assumes the form of sous-chef  and fuses with chef  to evolve into the chef/kitchen utensil-themed , gaining right arm-mounted cutlery and an extendable tongue. Despite completing the recipe, separating from Okumura, and receiving an arm cannon from Medic, 090 is destroyed by Kamen Rider Drive.
He assumes the form of fashion designer  to kidnap several young women in the hopes of finding one who can help him achieve his Over-Evolved form. After claiming to have found the perfect woman in Kiriko Shijima and kidnapping her, Kamen Riders Drive and Mach join forces to rescue her and destroy Tornado.
: A Cobra-Type Roidmude who assumes the form of an unnamed mafia boss and is tasked by Heart with eliminating Tenjuro Banno after the latter transfers himself into the Banno Driver. Despite nearly achieving his Over-Evolved form, 006's Core is destroyed by Banno, who uses the Roidmude's body as a vessel to manifest as Gold Drive.

Other Roidmudes
: A Spider-Type Roidmude who appears exclusively in the Televi-Kun DVD special Type TV-Kun Hunter & Monster! Chase the Mystery of the Super Thief! He attempts to sell counterfeit Televi-Kun issues until he is discovered and confronted by Shinnosuke and Kiriko. After gathering enough data on him, 027 transforms into a counterfeit version of Kamen Rider Drive until he is destroyed by the real version.
: A Spider-Type Roidmude who used the DNA of a deceased Shocker scientist named  to assume his form, finish the latter's , and ally himself with Kyuemon Izayoi to create the Yokai Buruburu during the events of the two-part crossover special Shuriken Sentai Ninninger vs. Kamen Rider Drive: Spring Break Combined 1 Hour Special. After Buruburu is destroyed by Kamen Rider Drive and the Ninningers, 089 uses Buruburu's Sealing Shuriken to become , combining his powers with Shocker's technology and fear from the Kibaoni Army Corps. However, he is destroyed by Kamen Riders Drive and Mach and the Ninningers.
: A Bat-Type Roidmude who assumed the form of robber  and appears exclusively in the V-Cinema Kamen Rider Drive Saga: Kamen Rider Chaser. After becoming a Gaia Memory-based criminal, 077 attempts to use the Beast Memory on himself, only to collapse on the border between the Tokyo and Fuuto prefectures and cause a conflict of jurisdictions between their respective police forces. 077 later awakens and successfully transforms into the Beast Dopant, but is destroyed by Kamen Riders Drive, Mach, and Accel.
: A Cobra-Type Roidmude and member of the Grim Reaper Unit with the ability to wield defeated Roidmudes' weapons who appears exclusively in the "Hyper Battle DVD" special Kamen Rider Drive Secret Mission: Type Lupin! ~Lupin, the Last Challenge~. Amidst his quest to find 100 different weapons and learn 100 different fighting styles, he steals Zoruku Tojo's Lupin Gunner and poses as him, gaining the ability to summon blank Roidmudes in the process. However, Tojo regains the Lupin Gunner and joins forces with Kamen Rider Drive to destroy 100.
: A wild and unstable Roidmude created from the merger of all 108 Roidmudes' fragmented data who appears exclusively in the V-Cinema Drive Saga: Kamen Rider Heart. He seeks to complete himself by absorbing the life-forces of the various human templates the Roidmudes copied or fused with, only to be destroyed by Kamen Rider Heart.

Akira Hayase
 is a retired police officer and Shinnosuke's former colleague. Six months prior to the beginning of the series, they were investigating the Neo-Shade terrorist organization when the Global Freeze occurred, during which Shinnosuke accidentally hospitalized Hayase. As of the present, the latter has begun physical rehabilitation, but is unable to return to active duty. Despite what happened, Hayase does not blame Shinnosuke and pushes him to move beyond his guilt and seek new goals in life. After learning Shinnosuke is Kamen Rider Drive, Hayase secretly supports him and works with the Metropolitan Police's vehicles division to procure space and materials for a Makeshift Emergency Drive Pit. Two years later, during the events of the tie-in novel Kamen Rider Drive: ~Mach Saga~ and the V-Cinema Drive Saga: Kamen Rider Mach, Hayase has joined the newly reassembled Special Investigations Division.

Special Investigations Division
Despite being allies of Kamen Rider Drive, few of their number are initially aware of his secret identity until he is forced to expose it later in the series. Following the Roidmudes' destruction, the Special Investigations Division is disbanded in the series finale, but is revived two years later during the events of the tie-in novel Kamen Rider Drive: ~Mach Saga~ and the V-Cinema Drive Saga: Kamen Rider Mach.

Rinna Sawagami
 is the Special Investigations Division's visiting electro-physicist who is in charge of engineering. Though she displays anxiety about her situation, her bright personality still brings up her teammates' spirits. Later in the series, she is revealed to be the engineer behind most of Shinnosuke's arsenal and aware of his and Mr. Belt's work. Following the Special Investigations Division's disbandment, she returns to academia, becomes an expert in electro-physics, and is awarded the Nobel Prize in Physics.

Kyu Saijo
Due to his obsessive personality, he also displays an intense fascination towards the topics the Special Investigations Division covers, such as the occult. Following the division's disbandment, Saijo becomes a popular network researcher and author, with his novel  becoming a best seller.

Jun Honganji
 is the Chief of the Special Investigations Division who comes off as an incompetent and goofy management level employee more concerned with pleasing his superiors and keeping an eye on his subordinates to ensure they stay out of trouble, but is secretly an astute and perceptive officer. An avid believer in divination and fortune-telling, he also has a tendency to wear an appropriately-colored tie based on the day's lucky color. Later in the series, Honganji reveals he was always aware of Shinnosuke's activities as Kamen Rider Drive, a longtime friend of Krim Steinbelt's, and that he personally established and maintained the Special Investigations Division to support Drive. Additionally, his apparent sycophancy was a front for him to find information on the Global Freeze from the police force's upper levels. Following the Special Investigations Division's disbandment, Honganji eventually rises through the ranks to become the Deputy Superintendent General of the Metropolitan Police Department.

In an alternate timeline depicted in the film Super Hero Taisen GP: Kamen Rider 3, Honganji continues to lead the Special Investigations Division with Rinna Sawagami and Kyu Saijo, being one of the few people who are largely immune to Shocker's changes to the timeline. After learning of what happened, he keeps Kamen Rider Black safe until he is killed by Cheetahkatatsumuri.

Genpachiro Otta
 is a lieutenant in the Metropolitan Police's , the first group to be sent out to investigate crimes, and liaison between his group and the Special Investigations Division. Despite dismissing the latter group as an "occult club", he is quite fond of Shinnosuke, which he tries to hide. Following the Special Investigations Division's disbandment, Otta is promoted to police inspector for, later chief of, the First Investigation Division.

In an alternate timeline depicted in the film Super Hero Taisen GP: Kamen Rider 3, Otta became a Shocker general and the monstrous  before he is killed by Kamen Riders 1, 2, and 3.

Mitsuhide Nira
 is a corrupt chief in the Metropolitan Police's First Investigation Division who works directly under Freeze as Soichi Makage, assisting him in controlling the police force and hindering the Special Investigations Division's attempts to stop the Roidmudes. Additionally, he suffers from an inferiority complex towards his partner, Eisuke Tomari, and killed him years prior while working with him to arrest Itsuro Negishi, who Nira framed for the murder.

After Freeze kills Shinnosuke and abandons him, Nira helps the Special Investigations Division revive Shinnosuke before they discover what he did. Nira uses a Neo Viral Core to fuse himself with Roidmude 106 and become the Thief Roidmude, but Shinnosuke separates them and destroys the Roidmude. Nira fuses himself with Brain and helps him achieve his Over-Evolved Form before turning turning the police and the public against the Special Investigations Division. However, his corruption is revealed and Brain abandons him, leading to Nira being arrested by Shinnosuke.

In the tie-in novel Kamen Rider Drive: ~Mach Saga~, Roidmude 005 breaks Nira and five other criminals out of prison. After killing Makoto Asamura for getting himself arrested again, Nira descends into madness from being humiliated by the Tomari family over the years and joins Negishi in leading an army of officers brainwashed by 005 in an attempt to kill Yukari Karasawa. However, a reformed Negishi sacrifices himself to shield the woman, allowing Shinnosuke to arrest Nira once more.

Eisuke Tomari
 is Shinnosuke's father and an officer in the Metropolitan Police's First Investigation Division. Twelve years earlier, the former discovered Freeze's deception, but was killed by his partner and Freeze's subordinate, Mitsuhide Nira, who framed bank robber Itsuro Negishi.

Tenjuro Banno
 is a cruel scientist, former colleague of Krim Steinbelt, and father of Kiriko and Go Shijima with a superiority complex who secretly holds a grudge against Steinbelt for creating the Core Driviars and cares little for his family, willing to treat them like slaves. Fifteen years prior to the series, Banno attempted to create an artificial life form capable of transcending humanity, but dead ends in his research drove him mad and forced him to convince Steinbelt to share the Core Driviar technology with him, which allowed Banno to create the Roidmudes. After witnessing Banno abusing a Roidmude, a horrified Steinbelt abandoned him, but Banno secretly stole his colleague's mind link technology, completed the Roidmudes on his own, and subsequently allowed them to mortally wound him so he could upload his consciousness into a computer tablet and kill Steinbelt. While the tablet wound up in Brain's possession, Banno used the Roidmudes to cause the Global Freeze.

Dubbing himself , Banno attempts to enact a second, worldwide version of the Global Freeze by using himself and three other Roidmudes to power the Sigma Circular. However, he is eventually confronted by Go and Chase, with the latter sacrificing himself to help the former destroy Banno's body and the Banno Driver over his pleas for mercy.

While he was within Brain's tablet, Banno possesses the ability to manipulate data, allowing him to create constructs such as tentacles capable of delivering painful electric shocks and a shield, and heal people infected by Roidmudes. As Gold Drive, he possesses ergokinesis and the ability to steal and use the other Riders' Shift Cars, Signal Bikes, and weapons until Rinna Sawagami develops a special data coating to protect the Shift Cars and Signal Bikes.

Sigma Circular
The  is a sentient machine created by Banno and Roidmude 004 that acts as the former's will and serves to dominate humanity and convert those that oppose Banno into data. Initially starting in an orb-like form, Banno intends to use Medic as a sacrificial power source and vessel, but Brain takes her place to save her from being brainwashed. Following this, Banno and the Grim Reaper Unit infiltrate the Special Situation Defense Center to help the Sigma Circular evolve so he can use it to enact a second Global Freeze. After the Kamen Riders, Heart, and Medic foil Banno's plans, the Sigma Circular kills a weakened Medic and saves Kiriko Shijima before it is destroyed by Kamen Rider Drive and Heart.

Guest characters
: A criminal psychologist pursued by Shinnosuke Tomari and Akira Hayase. During the events of the DVD special Type Zero Episode 0: Countdown to Global Freeze and episode one of the series, Koya became known as the  due to his penchant for posing as infamous criminals and desire to blackmail the public via the internet in retaliation for his scientific reputation being ruined. Shortly before the Global Freeze, he took a hostage, but was confronted by Shinnosuke and Hayase until Roidmude 005 took Koya to use his form and data before dropping him from a building, though Kamen Rider Proto Drive rescued Koya and left him for Shinnosuke. Two years later, during the events of the tie-in novel Kamen Rider Drive: ~Mach Saga~, Koya uses a blackout to free five prisoners the Special Investigations Division arrested. In an attempt to digitize his consciousness, Koya empowers the Anima System with humans' fear energy, but his efforts are sabotaged by 005, rendering him an empty shell. While remaining alive, he is briefly poisoned and cured despite being in cardiac arrest. Koya Nishiori is portrayed by Toru Nomaguchi, who also portrays Roidmude 005.
: An American scientist, the creator of the Kamen Rider Mach technology, and Krim Steinbelt's teacher.
: A vigilante who took on the pseudonym . While being chased by Genpachiro Otta and Shingo Tachibana, Judge framed Toma Okajima to evade capture for years until he is finally arrested by Otta when the Judge Roidmude becomes involved with his case in the present. Two years later, during the events of the tie-novel Kamen Rider Drive: ~Mach Saga~, Roidmude 005 breaks Judge and five other prisoners out of prison, but Judge is rearrested when Otta foils his attempt to assassinate Tachibana. After being re-imprisoned, Judge is murdered by Mitsuhide Nira for his recklessness.
: A high school student who Eisuke Tomari protected during Itsuro Negishi's bank robbery before she witnessed the former being murdered by Mitsuhide Nira twelve years prior. In the present, Negishi and the Open Roidmude target her because of her presence during the robbery, but Eisuke's son Shinnosuke Tomari successfully protects her. Nira and Brain later target her to prevent her from exposing the former as Eisuke's murderer, but she is saved by Tenjuro Banno. In the tie-in novel Kamen Rider Drive: ~Mach Saga~, Negishi and Nira lead brainwashed police officers in another attempt to kill Karasawa, but Negishi has a change of heart and sacrifices himself to protect her.
: A group of young ninjas and descendants of the Igasaki Clan, consisting of Takaharu Igasaki, Yakumo Kato, Nagi Matsuo, Fuka Igasaki, and Kasumi Momoichi, who are charged with protecting the world from the Kibaoni Army Corps. In the two-part crossover special Shuriken Sentai Ninninger vs. Kamen Rider Drive: Spring Break Combined 1 Hour Special, after learning their enemies joined forces to alter history, Drive and Mach join forces with the Ninningers to thwart them. The ninjas would later join forces with Drive to restore history once more during the events of the crossover film Super Hero Taisen GP: Kamen Rider 3.
: A former racecar driver who sought to win by any means necessary who was kidnapped by remnants of the terrorist organization Shocker and converted into the cyborg  and granted the use of the  car. First appearing the two-part crossover special Shuriken Sentai Ninninger vs. Kamen Rider Drive: Spring Break Combined 1 Hour Special, Shocker sends Kuroi to test his skills against Kamen Rider Mach before sparing him since he is not Kuroi's primary target. In the subsequent alternate timeline, Shocker has conquered the world and converted most of the world's heroic Riders into their Shocker Riders while allowing Kuroi to go rogue and fulfill his desire to become the strongest Rider. After Drive regains his memories of the original timeline, he challenges Kuroi to a race, during which the latter realizes the error of his ways and gracefully accepts his subsequent loss. Despite being turned into Shocker's Great Leader's , Kuroi uses the last of his willpower to bring 1 and 2 to the altered present and restore the Shocker Riders' memories before breaking free of the Great Leader's control to help the Riders fight Shocker. Once Drive and the Ninningers destroy the Rider Robo, Kuroi realizes it was the source of his powers and bids farewell to the Riders, promising to meet them again in the restored timeline, in which he has resumed racing.
: The daughter of criminal psychologist, Koya Nishihori, who holds a grudge against the Kamen Riders following her father's arrest. First appearing in episodes 27 and 28 of the series, she merges with the Seeker Roidmude in a plot to seek revenge on Kamen Riders and manipulate Kamen Rider Mach into killing her to ruin his reputation, only to be separated from Seeker and arrested by Kamen Rider Drive. Two years later, during the events of the tie-in novel Kamen Rider Drive: ~Mach Saga~ and the V-Cinema Drive Saga: Kamen Rider Mach, Mach arranges for Reiko's release from prison, but Roidmude 005 frames her for a series of murder cases. After learning of Mach's past, Reiko attempts to stop 005, only to be kidnapped by him and rescued by Mach, with whom she enters a relationship with.
: A traffic police officer who Chase copied the form of. Following a minor appearance in episode 47 of the series, Kano returns in the tie-in novel Kamen Rider Drive: ~Mach Saga~ and the V-Cinema Drive Saga: Kamen Rider Mach as a member of the revived Special Investigations Division. Koichi Kano is portrayed by Taiko Katono, who also portrays Chase.
: The leader of the criminal organization  and a fugitive who Shinnosuke Tomari and Akira Hayase pursued before the Global Freeze occurred. After recruiting Roidmudes into Neo-Shade and stealing the Newton Eyecon following Takeru Tenkūji's fight with Paradox during the events of the film Kamen Rider Drive: Surprise Future, Okamura resurfaces in the present. Despite drawing Tenkūji and a Gamma Commando's attention, Okamura evades them, only to be arrested by Shinnosuke, who indirectly gives the Eyecon back to Tenkūji.
: The heir to the Daitenkū-ji Buddhist temple who can transform into . After helping Kamen Rider Drive fight Paradox during the events of the film Kamen Rider Drive: Surprise Future, Tenkūji appears in the series finale to assist in the Metropolitan Police Department's investigation into Neo-Shade while working to recover the Newton Eyecon from the latter.
: A ghostly sprite and ally of Takeru Tenkūji.

Spin-off exclusive characters

Roidmude 005
 is a Bat-Type Roidmude who assumed the form of criminal psychologist, Koya Nishihori. First appearing in the DVD specials Type Zero Episode 0: Countdown to Global Freeze and Type TV-Kun Hunter & Monster! Chase the Mystery of the Super Thief!, 005 briefly kidnapped Koya to steal his form before the former's body was destroyed by Kamen Rider Proto Drive during the Global Freeze before his core was seemingly destroyed by Kamen Rider Drive. During the events of the Drive Saga V-Cinemas, Kamen Rider Heart and Kamen Rider Mach, Revenger's core is temporarily absorbed by the unstable Roidmude 5886 before Kamen Rider Heart destroys it, allowing Revenger to escape and frame Nishihori's daughter, Reiko, for his crimes, lure Mach into a trap, and attempt to kill him along with several father/daughter pairs, only to be destroyed permanently by Kamen Rider Mach Chaser.

Zoruku Tojo
 is a master criminal and gentleman thief nicknamed . First appearing in the crossover film Kamen Rider × Kamen Rider Drive & Gaim: Movie War Full Throttle and sometime after the Global Freeze, an aged Tojo found , an android that Krim Steinbelt created in preparation for the Roidmudes' attack against humanity with the intention of transferring his consciousness into it before he was forced to put the android in storage as it requires a strong mind to control it. However, he is confronted and defeated by Kamen Rider Drive, who burns out Cyberoid ZZZ and forces out Tojo's consciousness, which ends up in a Bat Viral Core. Via a holographic projection, Tojo promises Drive he will return.

As of the DVD special Kamen Rider Drive Secret Mission: Type Lupin! ~Lupin, the Last Challenge~, Tojo has become a Roidmude and recovered from his injuries, only to be attacked by Roidmude 100, who steals his Lupin Gunner to pose as him. Tojo eventually finds Drive and 100, steals back the Lupin Gunner, and helps the former defeat the latter, burning up the last of his energy in the process. Through a letter he sent before he died, Tojo leaves his Lupin Gunner and Viral Core with Drive for safekeeping. 

As Kamen Rider Lupin, Tojo possesses enough power to destroy regular Roidmudes and their cores. He can also combine the Lupin Gunner and the  Viral Core to access the former's dagger-like , which allows him to perform the  finisher.

Kamen Rider 4
 is a Rider that Shocker created to alter history who was created from a time paradox due to Takumi Inui's wish to protect people without having them die and appears exclusively in the after-credits scene of the crossover film Super Hero Taisen GP: Kamen Rider 3 and a self-titled three-episode web series. Following their failure to use Kamen Rider 3 to alter history, Shocker uses the History Modification Machine to send 4 back in time and lead the Shocker Air Force in another attempt. However, 4 is killed by Kamen Rider Drive.

While transformed, 4 possesses a wingsuit and pilots the Douglas A-1 Skyraider-esque , which can combine with two Shocker Fighters.

Eiji Tomari
 is Shinnosuke Tomari and Kiriko Shijima's son. First appearing in the film Kamen Rider Drive: Surprise Future, Paradox kills and poses as a future version of Eiji from the year 2035 in an attempt to alter history. However, Eiji used mind link technology that Krim Steinbelt had developed to upload his consciousness into his  Shift Car to help the present Shinnosuke defeat Paradox. As of the V-Cinema Drive Saga: Kamen Rider Mach, Kiriko has given birth to Eiji.

Paradox
In a future timeline where Banno succeeded in enacting the second Global Freeze, Paradox was sealed away by his fellow Roidmudes. However, Chase rescues and reveals the truth to Shinnosuke, who transfers Mr. Belt's consciousness to Paradox's abandoned Rider equipment before destroying him.

Utilizing Eiji's Drive Driver and Shift Brace in conjunction with the Shift Next Special Shift Car, Paradox can transform into Kamen Rider Dark Drive . While transformed, he wields the  sword and possesses the Mercedes-AMG GT-esque  car.

Angel
She uses her , which allow Roidmudes to experience human emotions, to convince others of her kind to join her in rebelling against Heart's leadership and give Chase the opportunity to fulfill his quest to become human via emotions as part of her plot to overload Roidmudes and humans' minds with euphoria until they die. Despite absorbing several Roidmudes to strengthen herself, she is eventually destroyed by Chase at the cost of his newfound emotions.

Notes

References

External links
Cast on TV Asahi

Drive characters
Characters
, Kamen Rider Drive
, Kamen Rider Drive